Tirat Zvi (lit. Zvi Castle) is a religious kibbutz in the Beit She'an Valley, ten kilometers south of the city of Beit She'an, Israel, just west of the Jordan River and the Israel-Jordan border. It falls under the jurisdiction of Valley of Springs Regional Council.

Etymology 

Tirat Zvi means Zvi's Fort. It was named after Rabbi Zvi Hirsch Kalischer (1795-1874), one of the fathers of the Zionist Movement and a leader of Hovevei Zion, while the tira or "fort" refers to a two-story mud-brick structure purchased from the Arab landowner, Musa al-Alami.

History

The kibbutz was founded on 30 June 1937 as part of the Tower and Stockade settlement enterprise. The founders were Jews from Germany, Poland and Romania and came from three groups: Kvutzat  near Petah Tikva, Kvutzat Shahal near Rehovot, and Kfar Yavetz. The Rodges group was named after the German village where the Religious Zionist Hakhshara centre (agricultural farm preparing youth for aliyah, or resettlement in Mandate Palestine) was located through which many of the founders of Tirat Zvi had passed. Kvutzat Shahal was named after the founder of the Mizrachi movement, Shmuel Chaim Landau (1892–1928), known by his Hebrew acronym "ShaChaL", or "lion".

The kibbutz was attacked on 28 February 1938 by an armed Arab mob during the Arab revolt. The attack was repelled with many casualties on both sides. On 20 February 1948, before the neighboring Arab nations officially joined the 1948 Arab–Israeli War, a battalion of the Arab Liberation Army led by Muhammed Safa attacked Tirat Zvi. The Arabs were repelled, after 60 of the attackers were killed. One kibbutz member, Naftali Friedlander, was killed in the fighting.

The settlement of Tirat Zvi was established on the land of the now-depopulated villages of al-Khunayzir and al-Zarra'a.

Climate
Tirat Zvi sits 220 meters below sea level. On 21 June 1942, it recorded the highest daytime temperature in Asia (54 °C; 129.2 °F), although the validity of this measurement has been questioned, and based on the published thermograph data it seems to have been somewhere between 52.0 to 54.4 °C.

Economy
The kibbutz operates a meat processing factory, Tiv, which sells its products locally and abroad. Tirat Zvi is the largest date-palm grower in Israel, with 18,000 trees. The kibbutz also has a lulav business. Working with scientists from the Volcani Institute, Tirat Zvi developed a method of preserving the palm fronds for several months, allowing them to be harvested in the spring and sold in the fall, for use on the holiday of Sukkot. In 2009, it produced 70,000 lulavs.

References

Edna Margolis, Isidor Margolis, R. Cohen & J. Cohen, Jew and Arab on the Border: A story of Religious Pioneering, Hapoel Hamizrachi of America, 1940, New York, Edited by Aaron Binnun.

External links
 Official website (English)
Hodaya's I-Face Project: Alice Eitan. For pictures of the Rodges farmhouse in Germany, the Rodges camp for immigrants near Petach Tikva, and a connected biography.

Kibbutzim
Religious Kibbutz Movement
Populated places established in 1937
Populated places in Northern District (Israel)
1937 establishments in Mandatory Palestine
German-Jewish culture in Israel
Polish-Jewish culture in Israel
Romanian-Jewish culture in Israel